Bear Lake is a natural freshwater lake on the Idaho–Utah border in the Western United States. About  in size, it is split about equally between the two states; its Utah portion comprises the second-largest natural freshwater lake in Utah, after Utah Lake. The lake has been called the "Caribbean of the Rockies" for its unique turquoise-blue color, which is due to the refraction of calcium carbonate (limestone) deposits suspended in the lake. Its water properties have led to the evolution of several unique species of fauna that occur only within the lake. Bear Lake is over 250,000 years old. It was formed by fault subsidence that continues today, slowly deepening the lake along the eastern side. In 1911 the majority of the flow of the Bear River was diverted into Bear Lake via Mud Lake and a canal from Stewart Dam, ending 11,000 years of separation between the lake and that river system.

Today the lake is a popular destination for tourists and sports enthusiasts, and the surrounding valley has gained a reputation for having high-quality raspberries.

History
The first known inhabitants of the Bear Lake Valley were Shoshone tribes, but the area was known to many Native Americans. The first record of Europeans seeing the lake is from 1818 when French-Canadian trappers working for the North West Company followed the Bear River upstream to the valley.

Originally named "Black Bear Lake" by Donald McKenzie, an explorer for the North West Fur Company who explored the lake in 1819, the name was later shortened to Bear Lake. Following his exploration of the lake, Mckenzie held what is known to be the largest rendezvous of Native Americans to take place in the Rocky Mountains. Nearly 10,000 American Indians from various tribes camped along 7 miles of Bear Lake's north shore, trading with Mckenzie and his trapping company.

The south end of the lake, in the area of modern-day Laketown, was also the location of two of the annual Rocky Mountain Rendezvous in the summers of 1827 and 1828. Mountain men, including Jedediah Smith and Jim Bridger, gathered at this location, along with trade goods suppliers and American Indians from several different tribes. The mountain men and Indians sold their furs in exchange for various store goods and supplies, and several weeks were spent reveling in assorted amusements and liquor.

Smith's arrival in June 1827 was especially historic, as it marked the completion of the first ever overland round-trip to California from the United States. He wrote in his journal: "My arrival caused a considerable bustle in camp for myself and party had been given up as lost."

Although the lake lies relatively near the Oregon Trail, which runs north and east of the lake, and was traveled by many pioneers between 1836 and the 1850s, it seems none of them went south enough to view the lake. It was not until 1863 that Mormon pioneers led by Charles C. Rich settled in the Bear Lake Valley, but they made an agreement with Native Americans, which left most of the Utah portion of the valley in Indian possession. The Mormons gradually moved south and established the villages of Garden City, Pickelville, and Laketown, each along the lake's shore.

In 1911 a diversion was constructed at Wardboro, Idaho that redirected the majority of the flow of the Bear River into Bear Lake via Mud Lake. Water then exits Bear Lake via an outlet canal to rejoin the Bear River. This allows the upper 6.5 meters of Bear Lake to act as a reservoir for the Bear River, storing spring runoff for irrigation later in the year. Before the construction of this connection, Bear Lake had been isolated from the Bear River for 11,000 years, though Bear River has connected to Bear Lake naturally several times over the 250,000-year existence of the Lake.

In later years, Bear Lake became a resort and recreation area, with many developers selling lake shore and mountain view lots. The beaches of Lakota and Ideal were given to private development in the 1970s, including the Blue Water and Sweetwater developments. The State of Utah bought the far southeast beach for use as a state park, and the state also operates a marina on the lake's west side.

Geographic features 

The lake and surrounding areas are popular summer tourist destinations. The lake has many marinas, beaches, and two tourist towns in Utah: Garden City and Laketown. It also has two state parks, each named Bear Lake State Park: one in Idaho and one in Utah. The Utah state park includes a one-half-mile-long Rendezvous Beach at the south end of the lake, the location of the 1827 and 1828 rendezvous, and a three-mile-long Cisco Beach on the east side, plus the additional campground, marina, and boat ramp areas. The Idaho state park includes north and an east unit, each with a one-mile-long beach. Bear Lake National Wildlife Refuge extends up from the north end of the lake.

Native and naturalized animals

Bear Lake has a high rate of endemism (native species not naturally found anywhere else). Several species evolved in the lake's waters, but many went extinct after the diversion of the Bear River into the lake. Surviving known endemic species of fish include the Bear Lake strain of the Bonneville cutthroat trout, Bonneville cisco, Bonneville whitefish, Bear Lake whitefish, and Bear Lake sculpin. There have been attempts to transplant these species to other areas without success, with the exception of the Bear Lake Cutthroat Trout strain. This trout has flourished in other large bodies of cool water, including the Strawberry and Scofield reservoirs.

"The Bonneville cisco eat only small aquatic invertebrates or zooplankton. They are eaten by larger fish in the lake including whitefish, Bonneville Cutthroat Trout, and introduced lake trout." Although several fish species have been introduced into the lake, those native species which survived the Bear River diversion have continued to thrive under careful management.

Water from the lake is used for irrigation in the nearby Bear Valley in southeast Idaho and for recreational fishing. The lake drains via the Bear River Outlet, completed in 1915, into the Bear River which eventually flows into the northeast portion of Great Salt Lake.

Raspberry cultivation
Bear Lake has become famous for the surrounding valley's crops of raspberries and for the annual Raspberry Days festival held in Garden City to celebrate the harvest of raspberries, generally during the first week of August. This event is said to bring thousands of people from all over the world and features rodeos, parades, fireworks, dances, a craft fair, "Miss Berry Princess contest", raspberry recipe cookoff, a talent show, fun run and concerts.

A majority of the originally introduced Bear Lake Raspberry plants were infected with a fungal virus during 2001 called the "raspberry bushy dwarf virus". Fewer than five acres survived. The epidemic resulted in most of the large berry businesses in Garden City being wiped out. Some crop acreage was replaced by newly introduced virus-resistant plants. Although some varieties of raspberries are resistant to the virus, none produce fruit as succulent and sweet as the previously cultivated plants. The raspberry business has since been redeveloped, and raspberries are again thriving, mostly in the southern end of the valley.

Recreation 
One of the main reasons Bear Lake has become a popular vacation destination is due to the high amount of recreational activities and attractions that are available throughout the year.
In the summertime, swimming, water-skiing, jet-skiing, boating, and sailing draw people to the water. Tourists also pass the time exploring the local caves or golf courses or taking mountain trails on foot, bike, ATV, or horseback.
In the cooler months, hunting, snow skiing, snowmobiling, or ice fishing are common attractions.
Many people try a "famous raspberry shake" at one of the local restaurants, or see a play at the Pickleville Playhouse.

See also

 Bear Lake National Wildlife Refuge
Bear Lake monster, a legend

References

External links

Official Bear Lake State Park website
OUTDOOR IDAHO: Bear Lake, Caribbean of the Rockies (2016)

Bear River (Great Salt Lake)
Great Salt Lake watershed
Lakes of Idaho
Lakes of Utah
Lakes of the Great Basin
Lakes of the Rocky Mountains
Lakes of Bear Lake County, Idaho
Lakes of Rich County, Utah
Tourist attractions in Rich County, Utah
American folklore